Napoléon, comte Daru (11 June 1807 – 20 February 1890), was a French soldier and politician.

Career

Napoléon Daru was born on 12 June 1807 in Paris.
He was the son of Pierre Daru and godson of Napoleon and Joséphine.
He studied at the lycée Louis-le-Grand, then at the l'Ecole polytechnique and at the l'Ecole militaire d'application in Metz. After becoming second-lieutenant of artillery in 1830, he participated with military honor in the French conquest of Algeria. He became peer of France in 1833.

During the French Second Republic he was a member of the National Constituent Assembly for Manche from 7 January 1849 to 26 May 1849, and a member of the National Legislative Assembly for Manche from 13 May 1849 to 8 December 1851.
During the Second French Empire he was a member of the Corps législatif for Manche from 6 June 1869 to 4 September 1870.
He was a member of the Académie des Sciences Morales et Politiques in 1860, and minister of foreign affairs in the cabinet of Émile Ollivier in 1870.

After Léon Gambetta dissolved the departmental general councils on 26 December 1870 Daru and Arthur Legrand, protested the measure.
During the French Third Republic Daru was a member of the National Assembly for Manche from 8 February 1871 to 7 March 1876. He belonged to the Orléanist parliamentary group, Centre droit.
He was a member of the senate from 30 January 1876 to 4 January 1879.
Napoléon Daru died on 20 June 1890 in Paris.

References

Sources

1807 births
1890 deaths
Politicians from Paris
Counts of France
Party of Order politicians
Orléanists
Government ministers of France
Members of the Chamber of Peers of the July Monarchy
Members of the 1848 Constituent Assembly
Members of the National Legislative Assembly of the French Second Republic
Members of the 4th Corps législatif of the Second French Empire
Members of the National Assembly (1871)
French Senators of the Third Republic
Senators of Manche
19th-century French military personnel
Members of the Académie des sciences morales et politiques